Pedro Temudo was a Portuguese footballer who played as a defender.

External links 
 
 

Year of birth missing
Year of death missing
Association football defenders
FC Porto players
Portugal international footballers
Portuguese footballers